Nawanagar is a village and corresponding community development block situated in the Buxar district of Bihar, India,  and one of the developing settlements of the district. It is one of several minor villages governed and administered by the  Nawanagar panchayat. The village has the only chauki (police station) among other nearby villages. Nawangar is one of the seven blocks making up the Dumraon sub-division.

As of 2011, the population of Nawanagar is 8,521, in 1,429 households, while the total population of the block is 166,534, in 25,557 households.

Geography 
The village is situated in the lower part of Bihar. Most of the area is agricultural land with rice as the main crop. Due to variations in annual rainfall, local farmers cannot depend on seasonal rain for irrigation and have instead constructed lined and unlined perennial wells for irrigation. A perennial canal has also been constructed by local governing bodies but the water supply is still insufficient for the farmers due to improper administration.

A seasonal tributary of the River Ganga passes through the village, which is inaccessible during the summer. The river is the nearest navigable inland waterway for mass transportation towards Kolkata in the east as well as parts of Uttar Pradesh.

Demographics 

Nawanagar is a rural block, with no major urban centres. The sex ratio of the block was 951 as of 2011, including a ratio of 941 among the 0-6 age group. Members of scheduled castes made up 14.59% of the block's population, and members of scheduled tribes made up 0.25%. The block's literacy rate was 66.57%, the lowest among sub-districts in Buxar district. Literacy was higher among men (78.76%) than women (53.78%).

Most of the Nawanagar block workforce was employed in agriculture in 2011, with 28.73% being cultivators who owned or leased their own land and another 52.84% being agricultural labourers who worked someone else's land for wages. 2.69% were household industry workers, and the remaining 15.74% were other workers. Comparatively more men than women were cultivators and other workers, while comparatively more women than men were agricultural labourers and household industry workers.

Infrastructure 
Nawanagar has good road communications due to development efforts by the government. A state highway passes through the village connecting Sasaram and Buxar via Vikramganj and Maliyabagh. A national highway also passes through the outskirts.

To reduce the load on local roads, Indian Railways has proposed a new railway communication between Mohaniya and Ara.

People and civil affairs 
Most villagers are employed in agricultural work but due to improper education and a lack of skills, total production remains insufficient to satisfy the people.

Although there are two government based schools and four private schools, students must travel long distances to other cities and towns for higher and modern education. The Indian government has also introduced various anganwadi kendra to provide basic education for villagers.

Panchayat 
The local panchayat consists of three villages: Nawanagar, Usra and Bhadkuda and includes a total of 13 panchayat polling booths. Munna Singh is the current mukhiya, (elected village head) of the panchayat. The sarpanch of Nawanagar is pushpa devi.

Infrastructure 
The village does not have a comprehensive electricity supply but through the efforts of local governing bodies, solar panels have been introduced to provide power for street lighting.

Villages 
Nawanagar block contains the following 107 villages, of which 95 are inhabited and 12 are uninhabited:

References

Villages in Buxar district